Tanteen Recreation Ground is a cricket and football ground in St. George's, Grenada.

History
The area in which the ground is located was formerly swamp land, which was drained in 1905. The ground has played host to public events, including a speech delivered by then President of Cuba Fidel Castro in August 1998. Representative cricket was first played there in 1997, when the Windward Islands played Guyana in a first-class match in the 1996–97 Red Stripe Cup. A further first-class match was played there in 1998, before a gap of seven years before the next. The ground hosted the Windward Islands in one first-class match in 2005, two in 2006, and one in 2007. In a 2005 match against the Leeward Islands, the Windward Islands Deighton Butler took a hat-trick in the Leeward Islands second innings. The ground has hosted a single List A one-day match in the 2006–07 KFC Cup between the Windward Islands and Guyana, which the Windward Islands won by 6 wickets despite a century by Guyana's Royston Crandon (101). Numerous women's representative matches have also been hosted at the ground.

As a football venue, Tanteen Recreation Ground is the home ground of Grenada Boys' Secondary School FC. It has played host to four international friendly matches for the Grenada national football team.

Records

First-class
Highest team total: 446 all out by Windward Islands v Guyana, 1996–97
Lowest team total: 177 for 9 declared by Windward Islands v Guyana, as above
Highest individual innings: 218 by Junior Murray for Windward Islands v Guyana, as above
Best bowling in an innings: 6-105 by Rawl Lewis for Windward Islands v Barbados, 2005–06
Best bowling in a match: 8-102 by Deighton Butler, for Windward Islands v Leeward Islands, 2004–05

See also
List of cricket grounds in the West Indies

References

External links
Tanteen Recreation Ground at ESPNcricinfo

Cricket grounds in Grenada
Football venues in Grenada